The Malayan mountain spiny rat (Maxomys inas) is a species of rodent in the family Muridae.
It is found only in Malaysia.

References

Rats of Asia
Maxomys
Endemic fauna of Malaysia
Rodents of Malaysia
Mammals described in 1906
Taxa named by J. Lewis Bonhote
Taxonomy articles created by Polbot